Alrich is a surname. Notable people with the surname include:
 Dora Alrich (1881–1971), German actress
 Emma B. Alrich (1845–1925), American journalist, writer and educator
 Matt Alrich (born 1981), American lacrosse player

See also 
  (born 1956), German foreign minister